Collalto Sabino is a  (municipality) in the Province of Rieti in the Italian region of Latium, located about  northeast of Rome and about  southeast of Rieti.

Collalto Sabino borders the following municipalities: Carsoli, Collegiove, Marcetelli, Nespolo, Pescorocchiano, Turania. It is located near the Lake Turano. It is home to a baronial Castle, which was owned by the Savelli, Strozzi, Soderini and, from 1641, by the Barberini families. The town is surrounded by a 15th-century line of walls.

Twin towns
 La Tagnière, France

References

Cities and towns in Lazio